Patrick Moynihan may refer to:

 Daniel Patrick Moynihan, known as Pat, American politician and sociologist
 Patrick Moynihan, 2nd Baron Moynihan, British Liberal peer
 P. H. Moynihan, U.S. Representative from Illinois